The vice president of Panama is the second-highest political position in the Government of Panama. Since 2009, the position of Vice President has been held by only one person.

Before 1945 there were positions of presidential designates elected by the National Assembly for a two-year term. The positions of presidential designates were replaced in 1945 by two vice presidents.

According to the current constitution, Vice President is elected in the same ticket as the President of Panama.

Presidential designates 1904-1945
Before the 1946 constitution was adopted, there were positions of three presidential designates: first designate (Primer Designado a la Presidencia), second designate (Segundo Designado a la Presidencia) and third designate (Tercer Designado a la Presidencia).

Vice presidents (1945-2009)

The 1946 constitution introduced two vice presidents instead of three. The position of second vice president was abolished in the 1972 constitution and reintroduced with the 1983 constitutional reforms. Vice Presidents were elected in the same ticket with the President.

Vice presidents after 2009

Vice presidents have been elected in the same ticket with the President.

Gallery of former designates and vice presidents

See also 
List of current vice presidents

References 

Government of Panama
Panama

1904 establishments in Panama